Panhormus, also known as Pylae or Pylai, was a settlement and station (mutatio) of ancient Cilicia, near the Cilician Gates (Greek: Kilikia Pylai) on the road between Tyana and Tarsus, inhabited during Roman Byzantine times. 

Its site is tentatively located near Han in Asiatic Turkey.

References

Populated places in ancient Cilicia
Former populated places in Turkey
Populated places of the Byzantine Empire
History of Mersin Province